Henderson is an unincorporated community in Jackson Township, Rush County, in the U.S. state of Indiana.

History
Henderson was founded in 1890 by Ida M. Henderson.

A post office was established at Henderson in 1890, and remained in operation until it was discontinued in 1903.

Geography

References

Unincorporated communities in Rush County, Indiana
Unincorporated communities in Indiana